The Chief of the General Staff of the Turkish Armed Forces is the chief of the General Staff of the Turkish Armed Forces. He is appointed by the President of Turkey, who is the commander-in-chief. The position dates to the period of the Government of the Grand National Assembly and the Turkish War of Independence. 

The current Chief of the General Staff is General Yaşar Güler, since 10 July 2018.

List of chiefs of the general staff

* Incumbent's time in office last updated: .

Timeline

Notes

See also 
 List of commanders of the Turkish Land Forces
 List of commanders of the Turkish Air Force
 List of commanders of the Turkish Naval Forces
 List of general commanders of the Turkish Gendarmerie
 List of commandants of the Turkish Coast Guard
 List of commanders of the First Army of Turkey
 List of commanders of the Second Army of Turkey
 List of commanders of the Third Army of Turkey
 List of commanders of the Aegean Army

References

Sources 
 Genelkurmay Başkanları listesi 
 Harp Akademileri Komutanlığı, Harp Akademilerinin 120 Yılı, İstanbul, 1968. 

Chiefs
Turkey
Turkey